Lee Gi-ro (born 23 November 1975) is a South Korean luger. He competed in the men's singles event at the 1998 Winter Olympics.

References

External links
 
 

1975 births
Living people
South Korean male lugers
Olympic lugers of South Korea
Lugers at the 1998 Winter Olympics
Place of birth missing (living people)